Shins may refer to:
 Shina people, an ethnic group of northern Pakistan and India
 The Shins, an American rock band

See also 
 Shin (disambiguation)